Events from the year 1826 in Ireland.

Events
5 January – Irish currency assimilated to that of Great Britain under terms of the Currency Act 1825.
12 July – in the United Kingdom General Election, four counties elect supporters of Catholic Emancipation.
The Landlord and Tenant (Ireland) Act is passed.
First life-boat stationed in Ireland by the National Institution for the Preservation of Life from Shipwreck, at Arklow.

Arts and literature
October – Tyrone Power gets his break as a principal Irish character actor at the Theatre Royal, Covent Garden in London.

Births
March
James P. Boyd, businessman and politician in Ontario (died 1890).
John Farrell, soldier and recipient of the Victoria Cross for gallantry at the 1854 Charge of the Light Brigade (died 1865).
13 August – Robert Spencer Dyer Lyons, physician and politician (died 1886).
4 October – Richard Smyth, Presbyterian minister, academic and politician (died 1878).
2 November – Henry John Stephen Smith, mathematician (died 1883).
14 November – Michael Morris, 1st Baron Killanin, jurist, politician, Lord Chief Justice of Ireland (died 1901).
Full date unknown
Robert Cain, brewer and businessman (died 1907).
Morgan Crofton, mathematician (died 1915).
Denis Dempsey, soldier, recipient of the Victoria Cross (died 1896).
Samuel Hill, soldier, recipient of the Victoria Cross for gallantry in 1857 at Lucknow, India, later killed in action (died 1863).
John Lucas, soldier, recipient of the Victoria Cross for gallantry in 1861 in New Zealand (died 1892).
Patrick McHale, soldier, recipient of the Victoria Cross for gallantry in 1857 at Lucknow, India (died 1866).
Alexander Wright, soldier, recipient of the Victoria Cross for gallantry in 1855 at Sebastopol, in the Crimea (died 1858).

Deaths
27 June – Mary Leadbeater, writer (born 1758).
25 September – Judge Fulton, judge, surveyor, politician, and founder of the village of Bass River, Nova Scotia (born 1739).
9 October – Michael Kelly, actor, singer and composer (born 1762).

References

 
Years of the 19th century in Ireland
1820s in Ireland
Ireland
 Ireland